Albert Potter Wills (1873–1937) was an American physicist who researched magnetic materials and was the PhD advisor of the Nobel Prize winner Isidor Isaac Rabi.

During his career he investigated magnetic susceptibilities, magnetic shielding, magnetostriction, conduction of electricity through mercury vapor, and hydrodynamics. He also wrote a textbook on vector analysis.

Wills received his PhD from Clark University in 1897 under Arthur Gordon Webster with a thesis entitled: On the susceptibility of diamagnetic and weakly magnetic substances.

During 1898–1899 Wills worked at the University of Göttingen and the University of Berlin. During 1899–1902 he was at Bryn Mawr College and 1902–1903 at the Cooper Hewitt Laboratory. His final appointment, 1903–1937, was at Columbia University.

In 1909 at Columbia University, Max Planck gave eight lectures in German. Wills translated the lectures into English, and in 1915 Columbia University Press published his translation.

References

Sources
 J. C. Poggendorff,  Biographisch-literarisches Handwörterbuch für Mathematik, Astronomie, Physik, Chemie und verwandte Wissenschaftsgebiete; P. Weinmeister, P., Ed.; Verlag-Chemie: Berlin, 1904; Bd. IV, p. 1644.
 American Men of Science, 2nd ed.; Cattell, J.M., Eds.; Science Press: Lancaster, PA, 1910; pp. 515.
 "Prof. Albert Wills is dead in Florida," The New York Times, Apr 18, 1937, p. 48 (or II 8), col. 4.
 National Cyclopaedia of American Biography being the history of the United States. New York: James T White & Co, 1939; Vol 27, pp. 430–431.
 A.P. Wills, "On the susceptibility of diamagnetic and weakly magnetic substances," PhD Thesis, Clark University, Worcester, MA, 1897. (Also appeared in Phil. Mag. 1898, 45, pp.432–447).
 I.I. Rabi,  Phys. Rev. 1927, 29(1), pp. 174–185

External links
 

American physicists
1873 births
1937 deaths
Clark University alumni
Bryn Mawr College faculty
Columbia University faculty